C. N. D. (Chandra Narayan Deo High School Baunsi) is a Bihar Government High School founded in 1945.

The school serves grades 9 to 12. The language studied is Hindi.

Location
Chandra Narayan High School is located near the railway station Mandar Hill in Banka District, Bihar, India.

Facilities
The school has a computing facility, laboratories, a library, a dormitory, and a playground.

References

High schools and secondary schools in Bihar
Banka district
Educational institutions in India with year of establishment missing